The Golden Record is the debut studio album by Montreal singer and indie rock artist Little Scream, released by the Secretly Canadian label on April 11, 2011.

The album features production by Arcade Fire’s Richard Reed Parry and accompanied by Aaron Dessner of The National, Marcus Paquin of Silver Starling, Mike Feuerstack of Snailhouse, Becky Foon, formerly of Silver Mt. Zion, Patty McGee of Stars, as well as Arcade Fire's Tim Kingsbury and Sarah Neufeld (also of Bell Orchestre).

Background 
The songs on the album were written between 2001 and 2010, with Laurel Sprengelmeyer stating "At least two songs were ones conceived in their original format by my little sister and [myself] for our first band, Big Unit. So the writing is all over the place. I kind of like to think of this album as a greatest hits record of my first three albums of unreleased material." They remained unrecorded and unreleased until Sprengelmeyer "forced herself to get over a painful fear of performing."

Recording 
Recording for The Golden Record began in 2009 with producer Richard Reed Parry of the band Arcade Fire. Of the recording process, Sprengelmeyer states "Because of Richard's schedule the recording process got spread out over a long period of time, almost a year and a half. The nice thing about that was that it meant we got to take a lot of time to listen carefully and think about arrangements and atmospheres for each song."

Sprengelmeyer approached the album making process "as a painting and building up layers and atmosphere". Unlike her previous efforts, Sprengelmeyer also increased her involvement on the technical side of the recording process, learning how to engineer her record.

Title & Artwork 
The album is named after the Voyager Golden Records, phonograph records that were included aboard both Voyager spacecraft launched in 1977, the contents of which were selected by Carl Sagan. In an interview with The 405 magazine, Sprengelmeyer elaborates, saying "I'm a sucker for tragedy. And as far as I'm concerned, the Voyager record might be one of the most poignant and beautiful and futile gestures of communication we humans may ever create. In the scope of my personal life, this record will likely have a similar significance."

Sprengelmeyer's own artwork is featured as the album cover.

Track listing

Personnel 

Musicians
 Pietro Amato - clapping, stomping
 Aaron Dessner - engineer, guitar
 Becky Foon - cello
 Mike Feuerstack - engineer, lap steel guitar
 Eric Hove - flute
 Tim Kingsbury - vocals
 Ben Klaff - arranger
 Patty McGee - drums
 Kaveh Nabatian - clapping, stomping
 Sarah Neufeld - violin
 Marcus Paquin - dobro, engineer, mixing
 Richard Reed Parry - arranger, background vocals, bass, drums, engineer, guitar, piano, producer, synthesizer, 
 Jess Roberson - flute, bass flute
 Stef Schneider - clapping, stomping
 Natalie Shatula - vocals
 Marika Shaw - viola
 Laurel Sprengelmeyer - arranger, composer, cover painting, guitar, piano, producer, synthesizer, violin, vocals
 Lily Sprengelmeyer - composer

Production
 Vid Cousins - engineer
 Tom Dempsey - photography
 Alan Douches - mastering
 Zoltán Kodály - interpretation, transcription
 Richmond Lam - photography

References 

2011 debut albums